Yuliy Sergeievitch Meitus (b.  in Elisavetgrad – 2 April 1997 in Kyiv), was a distinguished Ukrainian composer, considered the founder of the Ukrainian Soviet opera. His early style was modernistic, later he used more traditional neo-Romantic idioms.

Meitus was born to a Jewish family. In 1919 he graduated from the School of Music in piano from Heinrich Neuhaus, and from the Kharkiv Institute of Music and Drama in the composition class of C. Bogatyrenko in 1931. During World War II he was evacuated to the Turkmen SSR. Meitus made his debut in film in 1932. He is famous for his 18 operas, a number of orchestral works and about 300 songs on Ukrainian and Russian classical poems, among them Stolen Happiness, the epic Yaroslav the Wise, Daughter of the Wind, Leila and Majnun, The Young Guard and Abakan. He was buried in the Baikove Cemetery.

References

External links
Юлий Мейтус — возвращение в родной город on ZN,UA 

1903 births
1997 deaths
Musicians from Kropyvnytskyi
Ukrainian composers
Recipients of the Shevchenko National Prize
Soviet composers
Ukrainian classical composers